Reigh Count (April 13, 1925–April 8, 1948) was an American Hall of Fame Thoroughbred racehorse who won the 1928 Kentucky Derby and the 1929 Coronation Cup in England.

Reigh Count was bred by Willis Sharpe Kilmer and foaled at Court Manor near New Market, Virginia.

Racing career

1927: two-year-old season
He raced well as a two-year-old, winning four of fourteen races. He was initially trained by Hall of Fame inductee Henry McDaniel but after being sold to Fannie Hertz, by Bert S. Michell. A controversial finish in the Futurity Stakes at Belmont Park (the richest race in the United States at the time) possibly deprived him of another win. Just before the finish line, he held the lead. But due to either misjudgment of the finish line by his jockey or (possibly) intentional instructions by his owner, his stablemate Anita Peabody won by the barest of margins. The next day's New York Times photo captured the jockeys, side-by-side, looking at each other at the wire.

1928: three-year-old season
At age three Reigh Count was the dominant horse in America, winning six races including the 1928 Kentucky Derby. Jockey Chick Lang's victory three years earlier in the Queen's Plate made him the only Canadian jockey in history to win the most prestigious race both in Canada and in the United States. An injury kept Reigh Count out of both the Preakness and Belmont Stakes. However, later that summer in the Lawrence Realization, he defeated Preakess winner Victorian. That fall he took on and defeated older horses in the Jockey Club Gold Cup, which had a field including Chance Shot, Display, and Diavolo. Reigh Count's performances in 1928 earned him unofficial United States Horse of the Year honors. Although no formal award was made he was recognised in contemporary sources as "the champion racehorse of the year"

1929: four-year-old season
In 1929 Reigh Count was shipped to race in England at age four, with the Ascot Gold Cup as his principal objective and attracted considerable attention in the British press. In an interview in New York, Hertz announced that he believed Reigh Count to be the best horse in the world and that "he is over there to prove it". Reigh Count began his British campaign with disappointing efforts at Lingfield and Newbury where he was apparently unsuited by the cold weather and straight tracks. while his owner's "dazzling" racing silks provoked amusement among British racegoers. In Coronation Cup at Epsom on 5 June however Reigh Count recorded an important victory when he led in the last strides to win the race by a short head from Athford. Later in the month he contested the Gold Cup at Royal Ascot and finished second to Invershin. His improving British form led to some regret when he was returned to the United States shortly afterwards. TIME magazine reported on December 16, 1929 that his owner had turned down an offer of $1 million for Reigh Count, saying "I think a fellow who would pay $1,000,000 for a horse ought to have his head examined, and the fellow who turned it down must be absolutely unbalanced". Had the offer been accepted, it would have been by far the largest amount ever paid for a race horse.

Stud record
Retired to stand at stud at his owner's Stoner Creek Stud in Paris, Kentucky, Reigh Count produced 22 graded stakes race winners including:
 Count Arthur (b. 1932) - won the Manhattan Handicap and the Jockey Club Gold Cup
 Count Fleet (b. 1940) - the 1943 U.S. Triple Crown champion, U.S. Racing Hall of Fame inductee
 Triplicate (b. 1941) - won the Hollywood Gold Cup and the San Juan Capistrano Handicap
 Adonis (b. 1942) - won the Travers Stakes

Pedigree

References

External links
Press photograph of Reigh Count after his Coronation Cup victory

1925 racehorse births
1948 racehorse deaths
Racehorses trained in the United States
Racehorses bred in Virginia
American Champion racehorses
American Thoroughbred Horse of the Year
United States Thoroughbred Racing Hall of Fame inductees
Kentucky Derby winners
Thoroughbred family 2-e